Abdul Momen Khan (1 October 1919 – 12 December 1984) was a Bangladesh Nationalist Party politician.

Education and career
While a student, Khan was elected the first Speaker of the Students Union of the newly founded Fazlul Huq Hall of the University of Dhaka. He completed his Bachelor's with Honours and then Master's in Economics from the University of Dhaka in 1941 and joined as a faculty member at the Calcutta Government Commercial College in 1942. In 1954, he joined the Pakistan Civil Service. He rose to highest position of Civil Service in Bangladesh as the Cabinet Secretary before joining politics in 1977 being assigned the portfolio of Food in the Cabinet formed by President Ziaur Rahmam.

Momen Khan was a founder member of the newly formed National Democratic Party (JAGODAL) and member of its first central convening committee and later also a founding member of the Bangladesh Nationalist Party and its Vice President. He served as the Minister of Food during 1977–1982.

Khan was elected as a member of the Jatiya Sangsad in 1979 with the nomination from BNP.

References

1919 births
1984 deaths
People from Narsingdi District
University of Dhaka alumni
Bangladesh Nationalist Party politicians
2nd Jatiya Sangsad members
Food ministers of Bangladesh
Place of birth missing